Harvey Beaks is an American animated television series created by C. H. Greenblatt for Nickelodeon that first aired on March 28, 2015.

The series focuses on Harvey Beaks, a young, friendly bird, and his two best friends, the rambunctious twins Fee, and Foo. Together, the trio seeks adventure and mischief in Littlebark Grove, a magical forest that they call home.

On June 21, 2015, Harvey Beaks was renewed for a second and final season by Nickelodeon and it premiered on June 13, 2016.

On March 1, 2017, the show moved to the sister network Nicktoons.

During the course of the series, 52 episodes of Harvey Beaks aired over two seasons.

Series overview

Episodes

Pilot

Season 1 (2015–16)

Season 2 (2016–17)

Notes

References

Harvey Beaks episodes, List of
Harvey Beaks